Chamarajapuram is one of the earliest settlements and localities in Mysore, Karnataka, India, located in the centre of Mysore city. Initially an agraharam inhabited by the Mysore nobility, parts of it were later allotted other local dwellers as well.

History 
The City Planning Commission of Mysore laid out an urban city planning in as early as 1733 by Maharaja Chamaraja Wadiyar VII, just close to the near-extinction of the Dutch East India Company, when the French Company was at its peak in South India, and the British Company had just entered the South. However, execution of the plan began in around the 1780s by Diwan Purnaiah when under the Sultan of Mysore Tipu. At the time of its completion, Maharaja Chamarajendra Wodeyar IX was reigning, after whom Chamarajapuram is named.

Constituency 
Chamarajapuram falls under the Mysore Constituency in the Lok Sabha (national election) maps. In Vidhana Sabha (state election) maps, Chamarajapuram falls under Krishnaraja Constituency.

Lanes and Boulevards 
Several roads and areas have been commemorative of numerous Mysore and Karnataka era celebrities.
 Bajjanna Lane, named after Bajjanna, a wealthy philanthropist working for the Palace, who laid waterworks for the area
 Dr Vishnuvardhan Road, named after Vishnuvardhan
 K.G.Koppal, named after Kennegowda, a palace wrestler

In popular culture 
The cover illustration of R K Laxman's Malgudi Days is a painted railway station which was inspired by Chamarajapuram Railway Station.

Notable people 
 T Chowdiah, famously known as Pitil Chowdiah, a violin and fiddle maestro in Mysore Palace
 M H Ambareesh, T Chowdiah's grandson and Kannada film actor
 M A Chandan Kumar, T Chowdiah's great-grandson, a flautist
 T T Srinivasa Varadāchār, a dharmašhāstra āsthāna vidwan in Mysore Palace
 T T Srinivasa Gopālāchār, T T Srinivasa Varadāchār's son, also a dharmašhāstra āsthāna vidwan
 T. P. Kailasam, popular Modern Kannada author and playwright, lived in K G Koppal for a brief period

See also 
 Chamarajapuram Railway Station
 Kuvempunagar
 Jayanagar
 Ashokapuram

References 

Suburbs of Mysore
Mysore South